Nistor Grozavu (born 22 August 1959, Crasna, northern Bukovina, present-day Ukraine) is a Moldovan politician.

Biography 

Nistor Grozavu is a Moldovan architect, politician and former deputy-mayor of Chișinău (the capital of the Republic of Moldova).

Nistor Grozavu's candidature was issued by the general mayor of Chișinău, Dorin Chirtoacă and was supported by the absolute majority of the elected councillors. Nistor Grozavu is an architect by profession. He was the councillor of the general mayor so far and the dean of the Faculty of Architecture and Urbanism of the Technical University of Moldova.

Nistor Grozavu was elected deputy of the Moldovan parliament on the 5 April 2009 parliamentary elections on the Liberal Party (PL) list.

External links 
 Biografie

1959 births
Living people
Liberal Party (Moldova) MPs
Moldovan MPs 2009
Moldovan architects